Eugenio Zambelli (born 3 May 1948), best known as Dino, is an Italian singer and actor.

Life and career 
Born in Verona, Zambelli started his career as the singer of the group "I Kings"; in 1963 the group won the second edition of the Festival degli sconosciuti held by Teddy Reno in Ariccia;  struck by the voice of the singer, Reno contracted Zambelli with his record company, with the stage name of Dino. Between 1964 and 1968 Dino was a real teen idol and a  successful singer, with two major hit singles, "Eravamo amici" and "Te lo leggo negli occhi". 

Also active as a film and a stage actor, Dino retired from show business in 1973, and he became manager of an oil company; he resumed his musical activities in the late 1980s.

References

External links  

 Dino at Discogs

 
1948 births
Living people
Musicians from Verona
Italian pop singers
Italian male singers 
Italian male film actors